Sirte University is a public university in the city of Sirte, Libya, with a campus also at Hun. It was established as a university in 1991; for the two years before that, it was operated as a branch of Benghazi University.

There are thirteen faculties, or schools:
Agriculture Faculty
1) Department of Soil and Water 
2) Department of Plant Production and Plant Protection
3) Department of Animal Production 
4) Department of Economics and Agricultural Extension
5) Department of Food Science Technology 
6) Department of Natural Resources
7) Department of Agricultural Mechanization
Arts & Literature Faculty
Dentistry College
Economics Faculty
Economics Faculty at Houn
Education College
Education College at Houn
Engineering Faculty
 Mechanical Engineering
 Petroleum Engineering
 Electrical Engineering.
College
Information Technology Faculty
Law Faculty
Medicine Faculty
Nursing College
Science Faculty
1) Department of Chemistry
2) Department of Mathematics
3) Department of Computer Science
4) Physics Department
5) Department of Animal Science
6) Department of Plant Sciences

Notes

External links
  Sirte University official website 
 "Sirte University" African Studies Center, Michigan State University

Sirte
Universities in Libya
Educational institutions established in 1991
1991 establishments in Libya